Riess or Rieß is a German surname. Notable people with the surname include:

 Adam Riess (contemporary), American astrophysicist
 Erwin Riess (born 1957), Austrian playwright
 Fritz Riess (1922–1991), German Formula One race car driver
 Peter Riess (1804–1883), German Jewish physicist
 Lew Riess (1887–1946), American college sports coach
 Ludwig Riess (1861–1928), German-American historian and educator
 Ryan Riess (born 1990), American professional poker player and 2013 World Series of Poker Main Event champion
 Stefan Rieß (born 1988), German professional football player
 Susanne Riess-Passer (born 1961), Austrian politician

See also 
 Ries (disambiguation)

German-language surnames
Riess Family